Leondra Reid Kruger (born July 28, 1976) is an American judge who is an Associate Justice of the Supreme Court of California. A native of South Pasadena, California, she graduated from  Harvard College and Yale Law School. Kruger then clerked for U.S. Supreme Court Justice John Paul Stevens, and subsequently worked in private practice and as a professor. She served as acting Principal Deputy Solicitor General of the United States from 2010 to 2011, and worked in the Office of Legal Counsel. In 2014, California Governor Jerry Brown nominated Kruger to a seat on the Supreme Court of California. She was confirmed, and was sworn in on January 5, 2015.

Kruger was considered a potential nominee for the Supreme Court of the United States, following the announcement of Justice Stephen Breyer's intention to retire in 2022.

Early life and education
Born in Glendale, California, Kruger grew up in South Pasadena. Her mother, Audrey Reid, immigrated to the United States from Jamaica, and her late father, Leon Kruger, was an American Jew whose parents had immigrated to the U.S. from Europe. Kruger's parents were both pediatricians. She attended Polytechnic School in Pasadena, California, and was a National Merit Scholar.
She then earned a Bachelor of Arts degree magna cum laude from Harvard University, where she wrote for The Harvard Crimson and was a member of Phi Beta Kappa. She then attended Yale Law School, graduating in 2001 with a Juris Doctor. Kruger served as editor-in-chief of the Yale Law Journal, and was the first Black woman ever to hold the position.

Legal career

After law school, Kruger spent a year as an associate at the law firm Jenner & Block. She then clerked for Judge David Tatel on the U.S. Court of Appeals for the District of Columbia Circuit from 2002 to 2003 and for Justice John Paul Stevens of the U.S. Supreme Court from 2003 to 2004. She then returned to private practice for two years at Wilmer, Cutler, Pickering, Hale and Dorr in Washington, D.C. She was a visiting assistant professor in 2007 at the University of Chicago Law School.

From 2007 to 2013, Kruger was an assistant to the United States Solicitor General, and the acting principal deputy solicitor general. She argued 12 cases before the U.S. Supreme Court, and worked on a case defending the Affordable Care Act, National Federation of Independent Businesses v. Sebelius.

In 2013, Kruger became a deputy assistant attorney general at the United States Department of Justice's Office of Legal Counsel.

Judicial career 

On November 24, 2014, then Governor Jerry Brown announced the appointment of Kruger to the California Supreme Court.  On her questionnaire for the high court position, Kruger acknowledged she had never before taken a deposition and that, “I have not tried any cases to verdict or judgment.” Although she had no prior judicial experience, her selection was publicly praised by then-U.S. Attorney General Eric Holder, Obama's then-U.S. Solicitor General Donald B. Verrilli Jr., Obama's former Acting Solicitor General Neal Katyal, and former Solicitor General (under President George W. Bush) Paul Clement.

Kruger was confirmed on December 29, 2014, and replaced Associate Justice Joyce L. Kennard, who retired. She was sworn in on January 5, 2015, and became the court's second African-American woman justice, following Janice Rogers Brown. At 38, she was the youngest appointee to the court in recent years and the third youngest appointee to the court ever, after Hugh C. Murray and M. C. Sloss. In November 2015, Kruger delivered the annual Bernard E. Witkin lecture before the Los Angeles County Bar Association.

On the court, Kruger has emerged as an incrementalist, stating that she views her role as, at least in part, "enhanc[ing] the predictability and stability of the law" to improve "public confidence and trust in the work of the courts." She is sometimes considered one of the swing votes when the court is occasionally divided, and is seen as a moderate liberal on the progressive-leaning seven-member court.

Notable court opinions

National Lawyers Guild v. City of Hayward (2020) 9 Cal.5th 488, an opinion interpreting the California Public Records Act as not allowing a local agency to charge the costs of redacting statutorily exempt material from otherwise disclosable electronic records, and thereby clearing the way for members of the public to secure body camera footage from police officers. The Electronic Frontier Foundation praised the decision as "an unqualified victory for government transparency."

People v. Lopez (2019) 8 Cal.5th 353, which rejected warrantless vehicle searches for personal identification documents during traffic stops.

People v. Buza (2018) 4 Cal.5th 658, authored the majority opinion in a 4-3 decision applying settled United States Supreme Court precedent and leaving for another day a broader constitutional challenge to the 2004 California Proposition 69, which requires police to collect DNA samples from all persons who are arrested for felony offenses. The law has led to the storing of DNA profiles of tens of thousands of individuals arrested but never charged or convicted of a crime.

California Cannabis Coalition v. City of Upland (2017) 3 Cal.5th 924, authored the concurring and dissenting opinion in a 5-2 decision in which Kruger would have applied the state constitutional voter approval requirements, including the supermajority vote requirements, of 1996 California Proposition 218 (“Right to Vote on Taxes Act” and the progeny of 1978 California Proposition 13) to local tax increases enacted via the initiative power.

Barry v. State Bar of California (2017) 2 Cal.5th 318, concerning subject matter jurisdiction and California's anti-SLAPP statute.

U.S. Supreme Court consideration
After President Joe Biden made a campaign pledge to appoint the first African American woman to the United States Supreme Court, Kruger became the subject of speculation as a potential future nominee (Ketanji Brown Jackson was ultimately nominated to the seat). If she had been nominated to replace Justice Stephen Breyer, she would have continued the tradition of the court's "Jewish seat." While Justice Elena Kagan is also Jewish, Breyer sits in a seat historically assigned to a Jew for a large part of the past 100 years. The seat was held by Benjamin Cardozo, Felix Frankfurter, Arthur Goldberg, Abe Fortas, and Breyer, but also was occupied from 1970 to 1994 by the Methodist Harry Blackmun.

In February 2022, Kruger faced questions from the Biden administration regarding her interpretation of religious liberty, particularly in relation to her role in arguing the case Hosanna-Tabor Evangelical Lutheran Church & School v. Equal Employment Opportunity Commission at the Supreme Court in 2012.

Personal life
Kruger is married to Brian Hauck, a partner at Jenner & Block in San Francisco. Her young son attended her swearing-in ceremony to the California Supreme Court. About a year later, she gave birth to her second child, a girl, becoming the first member of the court to give birth while serving on it. She has two half-siblings.

See also 

 Joe Biden Supreme Court candidates
 List of African-American jurists
 List of justices of the Supreme Court of California
 List of law clerks of the Supreme Court of the United States (Seat 4)
 Vaino Spencer

References

External links 

 Profile. California State Courts.
 Oral arguments of Leondra R. Kruger before the U.S. Supreme Court. Oyez.com.
 Profile of Leondra R. Kruger. SCOCAL. Robert Crown Law Library, Stanford Law School.
 Past & Present Justices. California Supreme Court.

Videos 
 Confirmation Hearing of Leondra R. Kruger. Video 35:49 mins. December 22, 2014. YouTube.com.
 Presentation of Leondra R. Kruger at the ABA Criminal Justice Section annual meeting. August 5, 2016. Video 22:59 mins. YouTube.com.
 

1976 births
21st-century American lawyers
21st-century American judges
African-American judges
African-American lawyers
African-American people in California politics
African-American women lawyers
American people of Jamaican descent
American women lawyers
Harvard College alumni
Jewish American attorneys
Justices of the Supreme Court of California
Law clerks of the Supreme Court of the United States
Lawyers from Los Angeles
Lawyers from Washington, D.C.
Living people
People associated with Jenner & Block
People associated with Munger, Tolles & Olson
People from South Pasadena, California
The Harvard Crimson people
American scholars of constitutional law
University of Chicago Law School faculty
Wilmer Cutler Pickering Hale and Dorr associates
American women legal scholars
Yale Law School alumni
21st-century American women judges